Petar Petrović (Cyrillic: Петар Петровић) or Petar Petrovic may refer to:

Petar I Petrović-Njegoš (1747–1830), ruler of Montenegro
Petar II Petrović-Njegoš (1813-1851), ruler of Montenegro
Petar Petrović (magnate) (1486-1557), ethnic Serb magnate in Banat, administrator of Kingdom of Hungary, governor of Temes County and ban of Lugos and Karansebes
Petar Petrović (bishop), Serbian Bishop from 18th century in Archdiocese of Arad
Petar Petrović (footballer), Swedish footballer
Petar Petrović (swimmer), Serbian swimmer
Petar Petrović (politician), Serbian politician
Petar Petrovic, Swedish citizen of Serbian origin murder in the 2015 Gothenburg pub shooting